Michael Breij (born 15 January 1997) is a Dutch professional footballer who plays as an attacking midfielder or winger for SC Cambuur.

Career

Groningen
Breij made his debut for FC Groningen on 19 April 2018, in a 1–1 draw against FC Utrecht coming on in the 73rd minute as a substitute for Jesper Drost.

Cambuur
On 20 December 2019, it was announced that Breij had signed with SC Cambuur until the summer of 2021. He made his debut on 17 January 2020 in a 2–3 loss to TOP Oss, coming on as a substitute in the 72nd minute for Mitchell Paulissen. On 21 February, he scored his first goal for the club in a 2–0 home win over Roda JC Kerkrade.

References

1997 births
Living people
Sportspeople from Amstelveen
Dutch footballers
Footballers from North Holland
Association football midfielders
Association football wingers
Eredivisie players
Eerste Divisie players
Derde Divisie players
FC Groningen players
SC Cambuur players